Muhammad bin Ahmed Al Shaalan (died June 2015) was a Saudi military officer and commander of the Royal Saudi Air Force (RSAF) from 2014 up until his death in Saudi Arabia. Al Shaalan was initially reported to have died from a heart attack outside the country by the Ministry of Defense, during the Saudi Arabian-led intervention in the Yemeni civil war. In early June 2015, several Scud missiles were fired by the Houthis from Yemen and hit King Khalid Air Base, which serves as the center of the Saudi air campaign against them; he was killed in the missile attack. Al Shaalan was from a tribal family that spans Saudi Arabia, Jordan, and southern Iraq.

References

|-

2015 deaths
Lieutenant generals
Royal Saudi Air Force personnel
Saudi Arabian people of Jordanian descent
Saudi Arabian people of Iraqi descent
Saudi Arabian military personnel killed in the Yemeni Civil War (2014–present)